Belenois margaritacea, the Margarita's caper white, is a butterfly in the family Pieridae. It is found in Kenya and Tanzania. The habitat consists of montane forests.

The larvae feed on Maerua, Capparis and Ritchiea species.

Subspecies
B. m. margaritacea (south-western Kenya)
B. m. intermedia Kielland, 1982 (eastern Tanzania)
B. m. kenyensis (Joicey & Talbot, 1927) (south-eastern Kenya)
B. m. plutonica (Joicey & Talbot, 1927) (Tanzania)
B. m. somereni (Talbot, 1928) (central Kenya)

References

External links
Seitz, A. Die Gross-Schmetterlinge der Erde 13: Die Afrikanischen Tagfalter. Plate XIII 13

Butterflies described in 1891
Pierini
Butterflies of Africa